Alexander Stanley A. "Alli" Austria (born December 7, 1990) is a Filipino professional basketball player who last played for the Singapore Slingers of the ASEAN Basketball League (ABL). He played college ball for the San Francisco State Gators.

By December 2016, Austria secured a roster spot with the Singapore Slingers through the help of former Slingers player Kris Rosales.

References

1990 births
Living people
American sportspeople of Filipino descent
Basketball players from San Francisco
Filipino expatriate basketball people in Singapore
Filipino men's basketball players
Point guards
San Francisco State Gators men's basketball players
Singapore Slingers players
American men's basketball players
Terrafirma Dyip draft picks
Citizens of the Philippines through descent